Edward Wallington may refer to:

 Ernie Wallington (Edward Ernest Wallington, 1895–1959), English footballer
 Edward Wallington (civil servant) (1854–1933), English cricketer, colonial administrator and a of the British Royal Household